Charlie Guyer (17 February 1909 – 3 September 1977) was an  Australian rules footballer who played with St Kilda in the Victorian Football League (VFL).

Notes

External links 

1909 births
1977 deaths
Australian rules footballers from Victoria (Australia)
St Kilda Football Club players